The 2022–23 Vermont Catamounts men's ice hockey season was the 60th season of play for the program, the 50th at the Division I level, and the 39th in the Hockey East conference. The Catamounts represented the University of Vermont and were coached by Todd Woodcroft, in his 3rd season.

Season

Departures

Recruiting

Roster
As of September 12, 2022.

|}

Standings

Schedule and results

|-
!colspan=12 style=";" | Regular Season

|-
!colspan=12 style=";" |

Scoring statistics

Goaltending statistics

Rankings

References

2022-2023
Vermont Catamounts
Vermont Catamounts
Vermont Catamounts
Vermont Catamounts